Mohammed Shia’ Sabbar Al-Sudani  (born 1970) is an Iraqi politician who is serving as the Prime Minister of Iraq since 27 October 2022. He was the Human Rights Minister of Iraq in the Council of Ministers of Prime Minister Nouri al-Maliki from 2010 until October 2014. He was the Governor of Maysan Province between 2009 and 2010.

Early life 
Al-Sudani was born in 1970 to a Shia Muslim family in Baghdad. He is married and has four sons. Al-Sudani holds a bachelor's degree from the University of Baghdad in Agricultural Science and a master's degree in Project Management. At the age of 10, he witnessed his father and five other family members executed for membership of the Islamic Dawa Party. Sudani also participated in the 1991 uprisings that began after the end of the Gulf War. In 1997 he was appointed to Maysan Agriculture Office in which he was the Head of Kumait City Agriculture department, Head of Ali Al-Sharqi City Agriculture department, Head of Agricultural Production department and the supervisor Engineer in The National Research Program with the Food and Agriculture Organization of the United Nations.

After the invasion of Iraq by the United States and its allies in 2003, Sudani worked as a coordinator between Maysan Province administration and the CPA. In 2004 Sudani was appointed as the Mayor of Amarah City, in 2005 he was elected as a member of Maysan Province Council. He was reelected in 2009 and appointed governor by the council.

Career

Iraqi Minister of Human Rights 
He was appointed by Prime Minister Nouri al-Maliki as the Minister of Human Rights after the 2010 parliamentary election, being approved by parliament on 21 December 2010.

During 2011, he was briefly chairman of the Justice and Accountability Commission for De-Ba'athification which had the power to bar individuals from government due to links to the former ruling Ba'ath Party.

He was minister in August 2014 when thousands of Yazidis were massacred in northern Iraq by ISIS. He described it as "a vicious atrocity" and said it was the "responsibility of the international community to take a firm stand against the Daesh" and to "start the war on Daesh to stop genocides and atrocities against civilians".

He asked the United Nations Human Rights Council to launch an investigation into crimes against civilians committed by ISIS. He described the crimes of ISIS as amounting to genocide and crimes against humanity. "We are facing a terrorist monster", he explained. "Their movement must be curbed. Their assets should be frozen and confiscated. Their military capacities must be destroyed."

He was succeeded by Mohammed Mahdi Ameen al-Bayati in October 2014, when the government of Haider al-Abadi took office.

Prime Minister

In a bid to end the 2022 Iraqi political crisis the coordination framework officially nominated al-Sudani for the post of prime minister in May 2022. He succeeded in forming a government, which was approved by the Council of Representatives on 27 October.

In January 2023, in an interview with The Wall Street Journal, al-Sudani defended the presence of U.S. troops in his country and set no timetable for their withdrawal, referring to the U.S. and NATO troop contingents that train and assist Iraqi units in countering Islamic State but largely stay out of combat.

References

Living people
1970 births
Government ministers of Iraq
Human rights ministers of Iraq
Governors of Maysan Governorate
University of Baghdad alumni
Islamic Dawa Party politicians
Prime Ministers of Iraq